The ČSRU Cup is one of two rugby cup competitions in the Czech Republic, the other being the KB Cup.

Results
The scores in blue are links to accounts of finals on various sites - in Czech

Notes

External links
 Pohár ČSRU 2007
 Pohár ČSRU 2008
 Pohár ČSRU 2009

Rugby union competitions in the Czech Republic